The 1992 Hawaii Rainbow Warriors football team represented the University of Hawaiʻi at Mānoa in the Western Athletic Conference during the 1992 NCAA Division I-A football season. In their sixth season under head coach Bob Wagner, the Rainbow Warriors compiled a 11–2 record.

Schedule

Roster
Bryan Addison
Jason Elam
Ivan Jasper
Marlowe Lewis
Michael Carter
Travis Simms
Maa Tanuvasa
Matt Harding
Dataun Nihapali
Rodney Glover
John Hao
Kelly McGill 
Kendall Goo
Lenny Amosa
Tony Stornaiuolo
Tanoi Reed
Randall Okimoto
Marlon Smiley
Phil Cunningham
Blazo Sarcevich
Greg Roach
Derrick Branch
Steve Wilson
Agenhart Ellis
Walter Grisham
Zach Odom
Brian Gordon
Ta'ase Faumui
Geoff Barnwell
Doe Henderson
Ben Prohm
Harry Lyons
Glenn Carson
Eddie Kealoha
Doug Vaioleti

1992 team members in the NFL

References

Hawaii
Hawaii Rainbow Warriors football seasons
Western Athletic Conference football champion seasons
Holiday Bowl champion seasons
Hawaii Rainbow Warriors football